Paparā is a commune of French Polynesia, an overseas territory of France in the Pacific Ocean. Paparā is located on the island of Tahiti, in the administrative subdivision of the Windward Islands, themselves part of the Society Islands. At the 2017 census it had a population of 11,680.

Geography

Climate
Paparā has a tropical rainforest climate (Köppen climate classification Af).

References

Communes of French Polynesia